Donald Demetrius "Butch" Rolle (born August 19, 1964, in Miami) is a former professional American football tight end in the NFL for the Buffalo Bills and Phoenix Cardinals. While playing for Buffalo, he had a streak of 14 consecutive receptions for touchdowns. He played college football at Michigan State University.

References

1964 births
Living people
Players of American football from Miami
American football tight ends
Michigan State Spartans football players
Buffalo Bills players
Phoenix Cardinals players
Hallandale High School alumni